Lorenzo Guzman Cabanas Ayala (born 10 August 1979 in Ciudad del Este) is a Paraguayan footballer that previously plays for Persib Bandung in the Indonesia Super League.

References

External links

1979 births
Association football midfielders
Paraguayan expatriate footballers
Paraguayan expatriate sportspeople in Indonesia
Paraguayan footballers
Expatriate footballers in Indonesia
Liga 1 (Indonesia) players
Living people
Sportspeople from Ciudad del Este
Persib Bandung players
Persiba Balikpapan players
Persija Jakarta players